The Land Bank of Taiwan, Tainan Branch is the branch office of Land Bank of Taiwan located in West Central District, Tainan, Taiwan.

History
The bank building was originally constructed during the Japanese rule of Taiwan in the 1920s and established under the name of Nippon Kangyo Bank's Tainan Branch. Kangyo means promoting and awarding industries in Japanese language. After the handover of Taiwan from Japan to the Republic of China in 1945, the government seized the building and used it as Land Bank of Taiwan. In 1983, the arcade at its western side was demolished to make way for the Zhongyi Road widening and was subsequently restored.

Architecture
The bank building was constructed with columns in ancient Greek architecture and a mixture of Japanese and American architectural styles. At its exterior columns, there is a Swastika character, pattern of mums and Japanese Gods of Fortune. The overall building shape forms a triangle.

Transportation
The building is accessible within walking distance southwest of Tainan Station of Taiwan Railways.

See also
 List of museums in Taiwan

References

Buildings and structures in Tainan
Land Bank of Taiwan